The 1936 Colorado gubernatorial election was held on November 3, 1936. Democratic nominee Teller Ammons defeated Republican nominee Charles M. Armstrong with 54.57% of the vote.

Primary elections
Primary elections were held on September 8, 1936.

Democratic primary

Candidates
Teller Ammons, State Senator
Moses E. Smith, State Representative
Ray Herbert Talbot, incumbent Lieutenant Governor

Results

Republican primary

Candidates
Charles M. Armstrong, Colorado State Treasurer

Results

General election

Candidates
Major party candidates
Teller Ammons, Democratic
Charles M. Armstrong, Republican

Other candidates
Huston Hugh Marrs, Farmer–Labor
Paul S. McCormick, Socialist
James Allander, Communist
Claude C. Buhrman, National Union for Social Justice
Harvey L. Mayfield, Independent

Results

References

1936
Colorado
Gubernatorial